Virgie may refer to a place in the United States:

Virgie, Indiana
Virgie, Kentucky